Aethes amseli is a species of moth of the family Tortricidae. It was described by Razowski in  1967. It is endemic to Afghanistan.

References

amseli
Endemic fauna of Afghanistan
Moths of Asia
Moths described in 1967
Taxa named by Józef Razowski